Richard Synge (1648-1688) was Archdeacon of Cork  from 1674 until his death.

The son of George Synge, Bishop of Cloyne, he was born in Dublin and educated at Trinity College, Dublin. He held livings at Aghinagh, Kilcolman, and Aghabullogue. He was Prebendary of Kilbrogan in Cork Cathedral from 1669 to 1671; and Chancellor of  Ross from 1671 until 1674.

References

Alumni of Trinity College Dublin
Archdeacons of Cork
Christian clergy from Dublin (city)
17th-century Irish Anglican priests
1648 births
1688 deaths